The Stooges Brass Band is a New Orleans, Louisiana, brass band. The group was formed in 1996 after band leader Walter Ramsey saw a performance by the Rebirth Brass Band. The Stooges Brass Band is known for incorporating elements of hip hop, funk and R&B into a more traditional brass band framework.  The band has played the Bonnaroo Music & Arts Festival, the New Orleans Jazz & Heritage Festival, High Sierra Music Festival, and South by Southwest.  In 2012, they were selected by the U.S. State Department to tour Pakistan, and became the first American band to play in Hyderabad.

Biography
The Stooges Brass Band started in 1996 when band leader Walter Ramsey combined members of two rival high school marching bands.  After seeing the Rebirth Brass Band play, Ramsey was inspired to experiment with merging hip hop, funk, and R & B, influences into a traditional New Orleans brass band framework.  The band name evolved out of their stage antics, when one of the band members referred to the rest as “a bunch of stooges.”   Early members included Trombone Shorty, ’Big’ Sam Williams, Drew Baham, Ellis Joseph, Sammy Cyrus, and Dwayne Williams.

Over the next decade, the Stooges Brass Band gained a reputation in local clubs and second line parades.  Early successes included recording with Jessica Simpson, and production work for ESPN.

Red Bull Street Kings competition
In October 2010, the Stooges Brass Band won the Red Bull Street Kings competition.  The event featured four prominent brass bands in an elimination-style competition.  Red Bull flew the band out to their L.A. studios to record an EP and video music series with hip hop producer Mannie Fresh. The event was covered by the Documentary Channel, who released a documentary in 2011.

Touring
In April 2011, the Stooges Brass Band won the Best Contemporary Brass Band award from the Big Easy Music Awards.  The band began touring more aggressively in 2012, playing Bonnaroo Music & Arts Festival, the New Orleans Jazz & Heritage Festival, Edinburgh Jazz Festival, High Sierra Music Festival, Essence Music Festival, Lincoln Center Out Of Doors Series, South by Southwest, and others.  
In June 2012, the band was selected by the U.S. State Department to serve as cultural ambassadors on a tour to Pakistan.  They performed in Lahore, Islamabad, Karachi, and Hyderabad.

Can't Be Faded
In 2020, the Stooges became the first brass band in New Orleans to author a book with the release of Can’t Be Faded: Twenty Years in the New Orleans Brass Band Game, published by the University Press of Mississippi. Co-authored with Canadian music scholar Kyle DeCoste, the book chronicles the careers of sixteen past and present band members and documents the city’s brass band scene at the turn of the twenty-first century.

Discography

It’s About Time (2003)

Street Music (vinyl only release, 2013)

Thursday Night House Party (2016)

References

External links
 Stooges Brass Band Official website
 The Red Bull Street Kings Competition

American jazz ensembles from New Orleans
Jazz musicians from New Orleans
Brass bands from New Orleans
Musical groups established in 1996